Ghanim Muhammad Al-Muftah (born 5 May 2002) is a Qatari YouTuber and philanthropist with caudal regression syndrome. In 2017, he was Qatar's youngest entrepreneur at 15.

Biography 
Ghanim Muhammad Al-Muftah was born in Doha, Qatar on 5 May 2002, with caudal Regression Syndrome, a disease that affects the development of the lower spine. He has climbed Jebel Shams.

2022 World Cup 
He was appointed an ambassador for the 2022 FIFA World Cup. He headlined the opening ceremony alongside Morgan Freeman.

Awards 
2017: Young Entrepreneur, Takreem Foundation.

References 

Qatari mass media people
People with caudal regression syndrome
Living people
Arab YouTubers
2022 FIFA World Cup
Year of birth missing (living people)